Larry Surock (November 9, 1930 – September 26, 2007) was an American soccer player who was a member of the United States 1952 Olympic Soccer Team.

Surock graduated from Patterson High School where he was a four-time All Metro soccer player. In 1949, he was a member of the New York Giants baseball farm team in 1949.  Surock attended the University of Baltimore where he was a 1952 All American.  That year, he was called into the U.S. Olympic team for the 1952 Helsinki Olympics.  In 1954, Surock turned professional with the Baltimore Rockets of the American Soccer League.  He continued to attend night school to complete his degree and also served in the Korean War.  In 1957, the Rockets were renamed Baltimore Pompeii.  In 1958, Pompeii lost in overtime to the Los Angeles Kickers in the championship game of the 1958 National Challenge Cup.  In 1960, Pompeii withdrew from the ASL and continued as an amateur club.

In 1991, Surock was inducted into the Maryland Soccer Hall of Fame.  In 2004, he was made a member of the University of Baltimore Athletic Hall of Fame.

References

External links
 FIFA: Lawrence Surock

American soccer players
American Soccer League (1933–1983) players
Baltimore Rockets players
Baltimore Pompei players
Olympic soccer players of the United States
Footballers at the 1952 Summer Olympics
Soccer players from Baltimore
1930 births
2007 deaths
Association football forwards